Marc Gilbertson (born June 8, 1969) is an American cross-country skier. He competed in the men's 50 kilometre freestyle event at the 1998 Winter Olympics.

References

External links
 

1969 births
Living people
American male cross-country skiers
Olympic cross-country skiers of the United States
Cross-country skiers at the 1998 Winter Olympics
Sportspeople from Bloomington, Indiana
20th-century American people